The 2014–15 season was West Bromwich Albion's fifth consecutive season in the Premier League, their ninth in total. The season was notable for West Brom ditching the traditional white and navy stripes kit in favour of white and navy pinstripes kit, which angered many supporters. Eventually, the white and navy stripes kit was brought back the following season. During the season, they also competed in the FA Cup. West Brom were knocked out of the League Cup in the fourth round, losing away to Bournemouth. The club exited the FA Cup in the sixth round, after they were beaten by local rivals Aston Villa.

On 6 November 2014, Albion unveiled a statue to their record goalscorer Tony "Bomber" Brown outside the East Stand of The Hawthorns. A few days later, prior to the club's home match against Newcastle United, a blue plaque was unveiled in memory of Harold Bache, a former Albion player who was killed in action during the First World War. The plaque was subsequently mounted on the outside of the East Stand, opposite the statue of Brown.

Alan Irvine was sacked as head coach on 29 December, after a run of poor results, with Tony Pulis appointed as his replacement three days later.

During every home match throughout the season, the Albion fans applauded through the ninth minute of the match in support of the Justice for Jeff campaign. This concluded on 11 April 2015 when, for their home match against Leicester City, the Jeff Astle Foundation was launched. To promote this, and in memory of Jeff Astle, the players took to the pitch in a plain white kit, a replica of their 1968 FA Cup winning shirts. The kit featured no sponsors and was numbered 2–11 (with the goalkeeper in a blank kit).

In March 2015 a new Premier League record was set in the match between West Bromwich Albion and Manchester City for the biggest difference between the number of shots on target by two opposing teams (16 by Manchester City, 0 by Albion). This record still stands as of December 2016.

Players

First-team squad
Squad at end of season

Left club during season

Non-competitive

Pre-season
West Bromwich Albion's pre-season friendlies were announced on 22 May 2014, with several matches confirmed by the club later in the summer.
All times listed are in BST unless stated.

Competitions

Overall

Premier League

League table

Results summary

Results by matchday

Matches
The fixtures for the 2014–15 season were announced on 18 June 2014.

All times listed are local time (BST or GMT).

FA Cup

As a Premier League side, West Brom entered the FA Cup in the third round.

League Cup
As a Premier League team, West Brom entered the League Cup in the second round.

Player statistics

First team squad

Appearances include starts and substitute appearances. Yellow and red cards are from all competitive competitions.

Last updated: 24 May 2015
Sources: West Bromwich Albion and Soccerbase

Top goalscorers

Source: West Bromwich Albion, BBC

Transfers and loans

Transfers in

Transfers out

Loans In

Loans out

Released

Notes

References

West Bromwich Albion F.C. seasons
West Bromwich Albion